Jo Robinson may refer to:

Jo Ann Robinson, American civil rights activist.
Jo Robinson (author), American author.